Daniele Gastaldello (born 25 June 1983) is an Italian former professional footballer who played as a defender, currently in charge of  club Brescia.

Club career
Gastaldello was bought by Juventus in 2002 from Serie C2 side Calcio Padova; in that season he played in the Primavera squad. In 2003 season he was involved in a transfer with Nicola Legrottaglie. He was sold to Chievo along with Matteo Paro and Giuseppe Sculli. He was loaned to Crotone in January 2004. In 2005, he was bought back, but Juventus sold him in a co-ownership deal to Siena for €450,000. Matteo Paro also joined Siena. In 2007, Juventus bought Siena's half for €650,000 and sold Gastaldello to Sampdoria for €1.25 million.

On 5 March 2010, Gastaldello extended his contract with Sampdoria until 2014. Partnered with Stefano Lucchini, they finished 4th during the 2009–10 season. In the 2010–11 season, he often partnered with Massimo Volta in the 2010–11 UEFA Europa League and Lucchini in the domestic.

In March 2011, he signed a new five-year contract effective from 1 July 2011.

After the 2019–20 season he retired from playing and was appointed technical assistant coach by Brescia.

International career
Gastaldello received his first call-up for Italy on 28 August 2010 under manager Cesare Prandelli. On 29 March 2011, he made his senior international debut in a 2–0 friendly win over Ukraine in Kyiv.

Coaching career
After retiring as an active footballer, Gastadello accepted to stay at Brescia as a coaching staff member. On 7 December 2020, following the dismissal of Diego López as a head coach, he was named the club's interim head coach, overseeing a 2–2 draw against Cremonese before moving back to his previous role following the appointment of Davide Dionigi as new boss.

On 21 December 2022, Gastaldello was sacked by Brescia with immediate effect, following the dismissal of Pep Clotet as head coach. He was however re-hired by Brescia on 20 February 2023, this time as the club's new head coach.

Managerial statistics

Honours
Crotone
Serie C1/B Promotion Playoffs Winner: 2004

References

External links

Profile at FIGC.it  

Living people
1983 births
People from Camposampiero
Sportspeople from the Province of Padua
Italian footballers
Italy youth international footballers
Italy international footballers
Association football defenders
Calcio Padova players
Juventus F.C. players
A.C. ChievoVerona players
F.C. Crotone players
A.C.N. Siena 1904 players
U.C. Sampdoria players
Bologna F.C. 1909 players
Brescia Calcio players
Serie A players
Serie B players
Serie C players
Brescia Calcio managers
Serie B managers
Footballers from Veneto